Henry Gally Knight, F.R.S. (2 December 1786 – 9 February 1846) was a British politician, traveller and writer.

Biography
Knight was the only son of Henry Gally (afterwards Gally Knight), barrister, of Langold, and was educated at Eton and Trinity Hall, Cambridge.  He succeeded in 1808 to estates at Firbeck and Langold Park which his father had inherited in 1804 from his brother John Gally Knight.

Knight was appointed High Sheriff of Nottinghamshire for 1814–1815. He also held the office of deputy-lieutenant of Nottinghamshire. He was a Member of Parliament for the constituencies Aldborough (12 Augst 1814 - April 1815), Malton (1831–1832; 31 March 1835 - 9 February 1846), North Nottinghamshire (1835 and in 1837). In parliament he was a fluent but infrequent speaker. He was also a member of the commission for the advancement of the fine arts.
 
Knight was the subject of the 1818 satirical poem "Ballad to the Tune of Salley in our Alley" by Lord Byron, in which Byron facetiously accuses him of being not only a poetaster, but a dandy as well.

Knight owned Firbeck Hall in Rotherham. Sir Walter Scott's novel Ivanhoe is set nearby, and Knight may have been Scott's source of local information when he was writing the book. He was admitted a Fellow of the Royal Society on 20 May 1841.

Family
Knight was the nephew of the novelist Frances Jacson. He married Henrietta, the daughter of Anthony Hardolph Eyre of Grove Park, Nottinghamshire and the widow of John Hardolph Eyre. They had no children.

Works

Knight was the author of several Oriental tales, Ilderim, a Syrian Tale (1816), Phrosyne, a Grecian Tale, and Alashtar, an Arabian Tale (1817). He was also an authority on architecture, and wrote various works on the subject, including Hannibal in Bithynia, An architectural tour in Normandy (1836), The Normans in Sicily (1838), and The Ecclesiastical Architecture of Italy (1842-4), described by Pevsner as a "sumptiously illustrated sequel to The Normans in Sicily". These books brought him more reputation than his fictions.

References

External links

A very brief biography

1786 births
1846 deaths
People from Rotherham
People educated at Eton College
Alumni of Trinity Hall, Cambridge
Fellows of the Royal Society
Members of the Parliament of the United Kingdom for English constituencies
UK MPs 1812–1818
UK MPs 1831–1832
UK MPs 1835–1837
UK MPs 1837–1841
UK MPs 1841–1847
High Sheriffs of Nottinghamshire